The United States Air Force's 201st Combat Communications Group (201 CCG) was a combat communications unit located at Hickam AFB, Hawaii, USA. The 201 CCG was composed of a group headquarters and five assigned units located on the Hawaiian islands of Oahu, Maui, Hawaii and Kauai.

Mission
The 201st CCG's mission was to provide tactical communications and air traffic services in the defense and service of the United States of America and its allies. It also supports emergency United States Air Force requirements for air traffic control and communications facilities, as well as to provide tactical communications for the State of Hawaii, Department of Defense, in response to emergencies originating from either human or natural causes.

History

Emblem
Azure, a lightning bolt bendwise or garnished gules between a pattern of six mullets of five points of
varying sizes argent and in dexter base a silhouetted Hawaiian warrior brown fimbriated of the second,
all within a diminished bordure of the like.

Previous designations
 201st Combat Communications Group (1976–2013)
 201st Combat Communications Squadron (1967–1976)

Squadrons previously assigned
 147th Combat Communications Squadron - San Diego, California
 201st Intelligence Squadron – ???
 206th Combat Communications Squadron – Elmendorf AFB, Alaska (1 Oct 1987 – 1 Apr 2008)
 242d Combat Communications Squadron – Fairchild AFB, Washington
 291st Combat Communications Squadron – Hilo, Hawaii
 292d Combat Communications Squadron – Kahului, Hawaii
 293d Combat Communications Squadron – Joint Base Pearl Harbor–Hickam, Hawaii/Pacific Missile Range Facility, Hawaii
 297th Air Traffic Control Squadron – Kalaeloa, Hawaii

Bases stationed
 Joint Base Pearl Harbor–Hickam, Hawaii (6 March 1967 – 30 September 2013)

Decorations
 Air Force Outstanding Unit Award 
 1 Jan 1993 – 31 Jul 1994
 1 Jul 2003 – 30 Jun 2005

References

External links
 Hawaii ANG: 201st Combat Communications Group

Combat Communications 293
Combat Communications 293
Military units and formations in Hawaii